Paul Chabri Tarfa  (born 6 August 1941) is a retired Nigerian army major general  who was appointed Governor of Oyo State, during the military regime of General Olusegun Obasanjo, handing over to the elected civilian governor Bola Ige.

Early life 
He was appointed commandant of the Nigerian Defence Academy, Kaduna.
Under the military rule of General Murtala Mohammed (July 1975 – February 1976), Lieutenant-Colonel Tarfa became provost marshal general and was responsible, reporting to General Theophilus Danjuma, for the  clean-up campaign in the four divisions of the army. He was then given the almost impossible task of reducing traffic congestion in Lagos.
He was appointed Governor of Oyo State from July 1978 to October 1979.
When Ernest Shonekan came to power in November 1993, the Federal Government set up the Major-General Paul Tarfa Panel to undertake a one-year probe of the activities of the Nigeria Customs Service.

Bibliography

References

Living people
Governors of Oyo State
1941 births
Nigerian Defence Academy Commandants
Nigerian military governors